Crescent Lake is a lake near Cooper Landing, Alaska. It may be accessed by trail from near the Crescent Creek campground or from Carter Lake. The lake is somewhat popular with grayling fishermen.

References
55 Ways to the Wilderness in Southcentral Alaska
Flyfisher's Guide to Alaska
The Unofficial Guide to Adventure Travel in Alaska
Hiking Alaska

Lakes of Kenai Peninsula Borough, Alaska
Lakes of Alaska